Guo Li (born 11 May 1993) is a Chinese competitor in synchronised swimming.

She won a silver medal at the 2011 World Aquatics Championships and 3 silver medals at the 2015 World Aquatics Championships. She also won a silver medal at the 2016 Summer Olympics.

References

External links
 
 
 

1993 births
Living people
Chinese synchronized swimmers
World Aquatics Championships medalists in synchronised swimming
Sportspeople from Nanjing
Synchronized swimmers from Jiangsu
Artistic swimmers at the 2014 Asian Games
Asian Games medalists in artistic swimming
Synchronized swimmers at the 2015 World Aquatics Championships
Synchronized swimmers at the 2011 World Aquatics Championships
Synchronized swimmers at the 2016 Summer Olympics
Synchronized swimmers at the 2020 Summer Olympics
Olympic synchronized swimmers of China
Olympic silver medalists for China
Olympic medalists in synchronized swimming
Medalists at the 2016 Summer Olympics
Medalists at the 2020 Summer Olympics
Asian Games gold medalists for China
Medalists at the 2014 Asian Games
Synchronized swimmers at the 2017 World Aquatics Championships
Medalists at the 2018 Asian Games
Artistic swimmers at the 2018 Asian Games
Nanjing Sport Institute alumni
Artistic swimmers at the 2019 World Aquatics Championships